R725 road may refer to:
 R725 road (Ireland)
 R725 (South Africa)